Girth is Winters Bane's second album. It was released in 1997 as an independent recording. It was later re-released by DCA Recordings with the artist as Kill Procedure.

Track listing
"C4" - 2:48
"Kill Procedure" - 3:26
"Away" - 5:19
"Color" - 3:17
"X-iled" - 4:33
"Alexandria" - 4:04
"Porcelain God" - 4:10
"Hunting Time" - 3:02
"Download" - 3:41
"Spells Death" - 4:48
"Dark Paradise" - 3:22

Credits
Lou St. Paul - Vocals/Guitars
Dennis Hayes - Bass
Todd Bertolette - Drums

References

1997 albums
Winter's Bane albums